Madalin  is a village in the administrative district of Gmina Rędziny, within Częstochowa County, Silesian Voivodeship, in southern Poland.

The village has a population of 69.

References

Madalin